Twelve Microtonal Etudes for Electronic Music Media, Op. 28, is a set of pieces in various microtonal equal temperaments composed and released on LP in 1980 by American composer Easley Blackwood Jr.

In the late 1970s, Blackwood won a grant from the National Endowment for the Humanities to investigate the harmonic and modal properties of microtonal tunings. The project culminated in the Microtonal Etudes, composed as illustrations of the tonal possibilities of all the equal tunings from 13 to 24 notes to the octave. He was intrigued by "finding conventional harmonic progressions" in unconventional tunings. "What I was particularly interested in was chord progressions that would give a sensation either of modal coherence or else of tonality. That is to say you can actually identify subdominants, dominants, tonics, and keys."

Blackwood likened the task to writing a "sequel" to The Well-Tempered Clavier.

The Twelve Microtonal Etudes were re-released on compact disc in 1994, accompanied by two additional compositions of Blackwood's in tunings he explored in the Etudes: Fanfare in 19-note Equal Tuning, Op. 28a, and Suite for Guitar in 15-note Equal Tuning, Op. 33. The fanfare, like the etudes, was performed by the composer on Polyfusion synthesizer. The suite was performed by guitarist Jeffrey Kust on an acoustic guitar with a modified fretboard.

Sources

Further reading
Blackwood, Easley (1985). The Structure of Recognizable Diatonic Tunings. Princeton University Press. .

Electronic compositions
Microtonality
1980 compositions

he:מוזיקה_מיקרוטונאלית#שנים_עשר_אטיודים_מיקרוטונאליים